Łaźniki may refer to the following places in Poland:
Łaźniki, Lower Silesian Voivodeship (south-west Poland)
Łaźniki, Łódź Voivodeship (central Poland)